Qurra ibn Sharīk ibn Marthad ibn Ḥazīm al-Absi al-Ghaṭafānī was a statesman of the Umayyad Caliphate, most notable for his governorship of Egypt under Caliph al-Walid I between 709 and his death in 715.

Life
Information about Qurra's early career is obscure. According to interpretations of Michael the Syrian's chronicle, he served as governor of his native province, Jund Qinnasrin (northern Syria) or possibly Armenia during the last years of Caliph Abd al-Malik. He later became the katib (secretary) of Caliph al-Walid I, who appointed him governor of Egypt in 709. He was a sharīf (tribal noble) of the Banu Abs tribe, part of the larger Qaysi group resident in northern Syria and Upper Mesopotamia from the early Muslim conquests of the 630s. His administrative experience, coupled with the tribal origins he shared with the mother of Caliph al-Walid I, likely propelled his career during that caliph's rule. 

Al-Walid appointed Qurra governor of Egypt in place of his own brother Abd Allah, whose corruption was blamed for famine in the province. Qurra's governance was effective, and the chronicler al-Kindi reports that he "reorganized the dīwān" (the army registers, with the names of those entitled to ʿatāʾ, government salary), rebuilt the mosque of Fustat and began irrigation works in the desert. According to Hugh N. Kennedy, "in some ways Qurra is the best-known of all the Umayyad governors of Egypt", since "it is from his period of office that the richest collection of administrative papyri survive". His letters to the pagarch of Aphrodito are especially useful to understand judicial administration in Egypt at that time. He died in office in 715.

References

Sources 
 

 

7th-century births
715 deaths
8th-century Umayyad governors of Egypt
Umayyad governors of Qinnasrin
Ghatafan
7th-century Arabs
8th-century Arabs